Massimiliano Mondello is a male former international table tennis player from Italy.

He won a bronze medal at the 2000 World Team Table Tennis Championships in the Swaythling Cup (men's team event) with Valentino Piacentini, Umberto Giardina and Yang Min for Italy.

He competed in the 2004 Summer Olympics.

He was a ten times Italian champion from 1993 to 1996, 2000 and 2001 and from 2003 to 2006 and played for Italy over 300 times.

See also
 List of table tennis players
 List of World Table Tennis Championships medalists

References

1975 births
Living people
Italian male table tennis players
Olympic table tennis players of Italy
Table tennis players at the 2004 Summer Olympics